Jim Rowlands is a Welsh folk singer, who lives near Ploermel, Brittany, France. He had toured France over the last 30 years almost non-stop, promoting Wales and its music and culture in countless festivals, such as L'interceltique de lorient and Printemps de Bourges, and concerts, such as at Stade de France and Cirque Bouglione.

He played principally with harpist Hywel John, also a Welshman, as well as Mirrorfield, and made occasional outings with Y Cymry and Celtingpotes, his two Welsh folk rock groups, also based in France.

Rowlands has also recorded many albums of his own brand of Welsh Celtic songs, most notably Gobaith in 1999 on the SMC label and Pasbort in 2001, which was released in Wales on SAIN, and which contains the single "Cysgu Tawel" (a quiet sleep).

His music has played on at least one English-language BBC radio show in 2004, and the Cymru (Welsh) BBC lists him as a featured artist.

Rowlands wrote and performed the background music for The Naked Isle, a documentary about British prisoners of war. He has two daughters: Alys and Catrin Rowlands

Now aged 48, he has taken a back-seat from touring and live performance and although still releases music and albums, has turned his hand to writing novels, poetry and short stories, as well as one play.

References

External links
 Jim Rowlands home page
 Sarah Louise, "Llanast llwyr, ond mae hynny n beth da yn yr achos hwn," at The Free Library (in Welsh)

Living people
Year of birth missing (living people)
Welsh male singers
Place of birth missing (living people)